Katherine Barbara Aaslestad (May 30, 1961 – April 24, 2021) was an American scholar. She was a professor of history at West Virginia University in the Department of History from 1997 to her death. Aaslestad died on 24 April 2021, aged 59.

Aaslestad completed her undergraduate education at the University of Mary Washington in Fredericksburg, Virginia. She studied with Paul Scroeder, Mary Lindemann, and John Lynn at the University of Illinois, where she wrote a dissertation on the city of Hamburg, Germany during the Revolutionary and Napoleonic periods.

Awards and honors
She won the Caperton Award for Excellence in the Teaching of Writing and the Benedum Distinguished Scholar Award as well as outstanding teaching awards from the WVU Foundation, the Eberly College and the Honors College.

Selected works
 The transformation of civic identity and local patriotism in Hamburg : 1790 to 1815, 1997
 Material identities : tradition, gender, and consumption in early nineteenth century Hamburg, 1998
 Place and politics : local identity, civic culture, and German nationalism in North Germany during the revolutionary era, 2005
 Historica's women : 1000 years of women in history, 2007
 Revisiting Napoleon's continental system : local, regional and European experiences, 2014

References

1961 births
2021 deaths
West Virginia University faculty
American historians
People from Bellefonte, Pennsylvania
Educators from Pennsylvania
American women historians
21st-century American women
University of Mary Washington alumni